Puerto Nuevo is one of the 12 barrios of Hato Rey. It is home to the Academia Bautista de Puerto Nuevo.

References

Hato Rey, Puerto Rico
Municipality of San Juan